Guido Herzfeld (born Guido Kornfeld; 1870 – 16 November 1923) was a German stage and film actor. Herzfeld established himself in the theatre in the nineteenth century. In 1914 he made his film debut and went on to appear in over sixty films before his death.

His notable screen roles include appearances in Ernst Lubitsch's comedy Shoe Palace Pinkus (1916) and Victor Janson's First World War propaganda film The Yellow Ticket (1918). In 1920 he played the lead in Ewald André Dupont's Whitechapel (1920). His final appearance was in the comedy The Grand Duke's Finances (1924).

Selected filmography 
 The Canned Bride (1915)
 Shoe Palace Pinkus (1916)
 The Queen's Secretary (1916)
 Lehmann's Honeymoon (1916)
 Europe, General Delivery (1918)
 The Devil (1918)
 Die Arche (1919)
 The Duty to Live (1919)
 The Yellow Death (1920)
 The White Peacock (1920)
 The Red Peacock (1921)
 Man Overboard (1921)
 Wandering Souls (1921)
 Kean (1921)
 Roswolsky's Mistress (1921)
 The Graveyard of the Living (1921)
 Nosferatu (1922)
 Tabitha, Stand Up (1922)
 Sunken Worlds (1922)
 The Blood (1922)
 I.N.R.I. (1923)
 Bob and Mary (1923)
 Carousel (1923)
 The Grand Duke's Finances (1924)

References

Bibliography 
 Jung, Uli & Schatzberg, Walter. Beyond Caligari: The Films of Robert Wiene. Berghahn Books, 1999.
 Prawer, S.S. Between Two Worlds: The Jewish Presence in German and Austrian Film, 1910–1933. Berghahn Books, 2005.

External links 

1870 births
1923 deaths
German male stage actors
German male film actors
German male silent film actors
Male actors from Berlin
19th-century German Jews
20th-century German male actors